Daniel Vujasinović (born 13 September 1989) is a Slovenian professional basketball player for Sloboda Tuzla. He is a 1.82 m (6 ft 0 in) tall point guard.

Career
After spending several years in Slovenia, Vujasinović made a tryout with Bilbao Basket in 2009, but finally he came back to his native land.

In the 2012–13 and the 2013–14 Slovenian Basketball League seasons, Vujasinović finished as the top assistant.

In August 2014, Vujasinović signed for Spanish LEB Oro team Básquet Coruña for his first experience out of the Slovenian Basketball League.

On 20 June 2020 he signed with Helios Suns of the Slovenian League.

International career
Vujasinović played the 2008 and 2009 Under-20 European championships with the Slovenian national team.

References

External links
FIBA Europe profile
Spanish Basketball Federation profile
RealGM profile
Zlatorog Laško profile

Living people
1989 births
ABA League players
Basketball League of Serbia players
KK Zdravlje players
KK Zlatorog Laško players
Point guards
Slovenian expatriate basketball people in Serbia
Slovenian expatriate basketball people in Spain
Slovenian men's basketball players
Basketball players from Zagreb
Helios Suns players